"On My Feet" was the second single by Mystery Jets and their first on 679 Recordings (as part of the Good and Evil sublabel. The single isn't featured on the band's debut album, Making Dens (although the short instrumental, "Summertime Den", is based on "On My Feet"), but it is still played regularly during live sets.

Track listings 
All songs written by Mystery Jets.

7" vinyl (679GE01) 
 "On My Feet" – 4:34
 "Drowning Not Waving (live on Eel Pie Island)" – 3:51

CD (679GE01CD) 
 "On My Feet" – 4:34
 "The Tale" – 4:01

External links 
 Official website

2005 singles
Mystery Jets songs